Willson may refer to:

 Willson (name)
 Willson River, a river on Kangaroo Island in South Australia
 Willson River, South Australia, a locality on Kangaroo Island
 Willson Tower, a building in Cleveland, Ohio, USA

See also
 
 Wilson (disambiguation)